A national referendum was called for February 27–28, 1975 where the majority of the barangays voted approved the following:
The use by the President of his power to restructure the local governments in Greater Manila into an integrated system like a manager- commission for under such terms and conditions as he may decide,
The appointment by the President of the successors of local elective officials (outside the Greater Manila) whose terms of office expired on Dec. 31, 1975, and
The manner the President has been exercising his powers under Martial Law and the Constitution and that the President should continue exercising the same powers.
Referendum allowing Martial law to continue, not to convene the Interim National Assembly and extend the terms of local officials by appointment, and suspend elections, pursuant to Presidential Decrees Nos. 1366, 1366-A and 1366-B.

Results

For Greater Manila

On local governments and officials 
1. Do you want the present Mayor-Council form of government now existing in the cities and municipalities of Greater Manila to continue?

2. If you do not want the Mayor-Council type to continue, do you favor the President exercising his powers to restructure the local governments in Greater Manila (four cities and 13 municipalities) into an integrated system like a Manager or Commission form under such terms and conditions as he may decide?

On martial law 
1. Do you approve of the manner President Marcos has been exercising his powers under Martial Law and the Constitution, including the power to issue proclamations, orders, decrees and instructions with the force of law?2. Do you want the President to continue exercising the same power?

For areas outside of Greater Manila

On local officials 
At the expiration of the terms of office of your local elective officials on December 31, 1975, how do you want their successors chosen: to be appointed by the President or elected in accordance with the Election Code?

On martial law 
1. Do you approve of the manner President Marcos has been exercising his powers under Martial Law and the Constitution, including the power to issue proclamations, orders, decrees and instructions with the force of law?2. Do you want the President to continue exercising the same power?

See also 
Commission on Elections
Politics of the Philippines
Philippine elections

References

External links
 Official website of the Commission on Elections

Referendums in the Philippines
1975 elections in the Philippines
1975 referendums
Presidency of Ferdinand Marcos